The Norwegian Softball and Baseball Federation ( or ; NSBF) is the governing body for baseball and softball in Norway. It is a member of the Norwegian Olympic Committee, the Confederation of European Baseball, and the European Softball Federation. The NSBF runs two leagues in Norway, the Norsk Baseballiga 1st and 2nd divisions, as well as Norway's national baseball team and national softball team.

References

External links
 Official site (in Norwegian)

Organisations based in Oslo
Softball
1991 establishments in Norway
Baseball in Norway
Softball in Norway
Baseball governing bodies in Europe
Softball organizations